The East Northwall Firn was a glacier on Mount Carstensz in the Sudirman Range on the island of New Guinea in Central Papua province, Indonesia. Situated at an elevation of approximately   NNW of Puncak Jaya, the highest summit in Oceania. It broke up in three patches in or before 2017.

Sometime between 1936 and 1962, a single Northwall Firn split into several separate glaciers, the largest being the East Northwall Firn and the West Northwall Firn. Research presented in 2004 of IKONOS satellite imagery of the New Guinean glaciers indicated that in the two years from 2000 to 2002, the East Northwall Firn had lost a further 4.5% of its surface area. At that rate, the remaining glaciers in the immediate region near Puncak Jaya were expected to last only to the year 2015. Indeed, in or before 2017, the West Northwall Firn had completely disappeared and the eastern Firn had broken up in three small patches .

At least one previous icecap also existed in the region between 15,000 and 7,000 years ago.

See also
 Retreat of glaciers since 1850
 List of glaciers

References

Glaciers of Western New Guinea